The Graphite-Epoxy Motor (GEM) is a family of solid rocket boosters first developed in the late 1980s and used from 1990 to the present day. GEM motors are manufactured with carbon-fibre-reinforced polymer casings and a fuel consisting of HTPB-bound ammonium perchlorate composite propellant. GEM is currently produced by Northrop Grumman Space Systems. GEM boosters were previously used on the Delta II, Delta III, and Delta IV launch vehicles, and are currently used on the Atlas V. A new variant, the GEM 63XL, is slated to fly as part of the Vulcan Centaur launch vehicle no earlier than the 1st quarter of 2023.

Variants

Active

GEM 63 
The GEM 63 was developed by Orbital ATK as a low-cost drop-in replacement for the Aerojet Rocketdyne AJ-60A solid rocket booster used on the Atlas V. Its overall dimensions are very similar to that of the motor it replaces. The Atlas V first flew with the GEM 63 in 2020 on the NROL-101 launch. The booster offers higher performance at about half the cost of the AJ-60A boosters formerly used on the Atlas V. The change to GEM motors also allows a degree of commonality between the Atlas V and Delta IV, which are both produced and marketed by the United Launch Alliance.

GEM 63XL 
The GEM 63XL, developed by Northrop Grumman, is an extended version of the GEM 63, about 73 inches (185 cm) longer than its predecessor. First fired in 2020, it will be used on the Vulcan launch vehicle beginning no earlier than 2022. Up to 6 of the boosters will be mounted on a single Vulcan core, depending on customer needs. A variant equipped with a thrust-vectoring nozzle, the GEM 63XLT, was under development for the cancelled OmegA launch vehicle.

Retired

GEM 40 

The GEM 40 was a  solid rocket motor developed for the 7000-series Delta II launch vehicle beginning in 1987 by Hercules. Its first flight took place in 1990 on the USA-66 mission, when 9 boosters were used on a Delta II 7925 launcher. The use of composite materials allowed for casings lighter than the steel casings of the Castor 4 SRMs they replaced. The reduction in weight was used to extend the GEM 40 by 1,8 meter (6 feet) compared to the Castor 4 used on 6000-series Delta II.  Delta II vehicles could be configured with three, four, or nine GEM 40 boosters. When using three or four boosters, all GEM 40s were ignited on the ground. On nine-booster Delta II, six were ignited on the ground; the remaining three were ignited in flight after burnout of the first six. A variant with a thrust-vectoring nozzle, the GEM 40VN, was developed for the Ground-based Midcourse Defence anti-ballistic missile program.

Failures 
On 5 August, 1995, an air-lit GEM 40 failed to separate from a Delta II 7925 carrying Koreasat 1. The excess mass of the booster resulted in the satellite reaching a lower orbit than intended. The satellite was able to correct for the error using on-board propellant.

On 17 January, 1997, a Delta II (Delta 241) exploded due to a catastrophic failure in a GEM 40. The failure triggered the launch vehicle's self-destruct function 13 seconds after ignition. An Air Force investigation determined that the motor's casing had been damaged prior to launch, causing the case to split open soon after ignition.

GEM 46 
The GEM 46 was a  solid rocket motor originally developed for Delta III by Alliant Techsystems. This solid motor variant included thrust vector control (TVC) to help steer the vehicle. After the discontinuation of the Delta III, GEM 46 motors (without TVC) were used on the Delta II to create the Delta II Heavy, which could only be launched from a modified pad at Cape Canaveral Air Force Station, SLC-17B.  Both Delta III and Delta II Heavy used nine GEM 46s, with six ignited on the ground and three air-lit.

Failures 
On 27 August, 1998, the GEM 46 boosters on the first Delta III, carrying the Galaxy 10 satellite, depleted their hydraulic fluid used to control the thrust-vectoring nozzle. This was due to guidance issues with the rest of the rocket, which forced the solid rocket motors to make rapid adjustments to compensate, using up the supply of hydraulic fluid before burnout. The nozzles were then stuck in a position that turned the rocket over, triggering the vehicle's self-destruct function 70 seconds after ignition.

GEM 60 
The GEM 60 was a  solid motor used on the Delta IV family of launch vehicles, used with and without thrust vector control. Developed for the EELV program, its first flight was on 20 November 2002, boosting the first launch of the Delta IV. Delta IV Medium+ launchers were built with either two or four GEM 60. The added performance from the solid rocket motors allowed variants of the Delta IV Medium+ to accommodate a larger second stage. The motor was retired in 2019 after the final Delta IV Medium launch. Throughout its lifetime, 64 GEM 60 boosters were flown; there were no failures.

Version comparison

Gallery

See also
 Solid rocket
 Spacecraft propulsion
 Composite overwrapped pressure vessel

References

Solid-fuel rockets